Manuel París Ricaurte (1780–1814) was a Colombian military man who was a crucial figure in the independence of Colombia and Venezuela.

Ancestors

1780 births
1814 deaths
People from Bogotá
Colombian military personnel
Venezuelan military personnel
People of the Venezuelan War of Independence